Idrottsparken (or Sundsvalls Idrottspark), currently known as NP3 Arena for sponsorship reasons, is a multi-purpose stadium in Sundsvall, Sweden. It was opened on 6th of August 1903. It is currently used mostly for football matches and is the home stadium of GIF Sundsvall and Sundsvalls DFF. The stadium holds 8,000 people during football matches. 

The stadium was expanded in 2002 and was also called Sundsvall Park Arena during concerts 2002 – 2006. Between 2006 and 2016, it was known as Norrporten Arena for sponsorship reasons.

History 
The venue was inaugurated in 1903, the same year as GIF Sundsvall and had tracks for running, skittles, shooting and tennis. Idrottsparken undergone a major renovation in the early 2000s and was re-inaugared by Carl XVI Gustaf on ninth of June 2002. The football pitch had grass as turf until 2004 when it switched to artificial turf, mainly because of poor quality of the grass turf due to cold climate.

Overview

Gallery

See also 
 Allsvenskan 
 GIF Sundsvall
 Superettan

References

The Stadium Guide
World Stadiums

External links 

 NP3 Arena at gifsundsvall.se

Football venues in Sweden
Sport in Sundsvall
Multi-purpose stadiums in Sweden
GIF Sundsvall
Buildings and structures in Sundsvall Municipality
Sports venues completed in 1903
1903 establishments in Sweden